An ally is a member of an alliance.

Ally may also refer to:

Place names
 Ally, Cantal, a commune in the Cantal department in south-central France
 Ally, County Tyrone, a townland in County Tyrone, Northern Ireland
 Ally, Haute-Loire, a commune in the Haute-Loire department in south-central France

People
 Ally (name)

Art, entertainment, and media
 Ally (novel), a 2007 science fiction novel by Karen Traviss
 Ally (TV series), a 1999 American television sitcom that was a spin-off of Ally McBeal

Biology
 Another species belonging to the same biological family

Enterprises
 Ally Fashion, an Australian women's fashion retailer
 Ally Financial, a bank holding company, formerly known as General Motors Acceptance Corporation (GMAC)

Other
 Straight ally

See also 
 Alley
 Aly (disambiguation)
 Ali (disambiguation)
 Alli (disambiguation)
 Allie (disambiguation)
 Allies (disambiguation)